Pam Hallandal (January 16, 1929- September 25, 2018) was an Australian artist, best known for her work in drawing and print making.

Early life and education
Born in Melbourne, Australia in 1929 Hallandal was the daughter of an amateur painter and architect. She studied sculpture and ceramics and RMIT c.1950 and at the Central School of Art in London from 1956 - 1957. From the 1960s Pam's practice shifted to focus on drawing. She had originally enrolled in the sculpture department of RMIT, but was discouraged from attending because of her small stature and minimal limp, a result of childhood polio.

Career
Hallandal's initial work was focused on small scale modernist sculpture. However, from the early the 1970s to the present day she became well known for drawing and printmaking.  Hallandal taught at the George Bell School, was the Head of drawing at Prahran Technical College, which later became Victoria College Prahran, finishing her long and dedicated career in education at Victorian College of the Arts, Melbourne. Hallandel championed observational drawing, draftsmanship and drawing education keeping the practice alive within the tertiary syllabus in Victoria.

Work
Hallandal's drawings are figurative charcoal, pastel and ink works on paper. Using dramatic effects through contrasting light and shadow Hallandel's works are dark and expressive. She recorded her distinctive vision of the world and the life that takes place around her from prosaic details of suburban life to tragic and cataclysmic world events. Portraits,  self-portraits, global and daily scenes like the triptych To the tune of the cash register, 1991, Hallandels's works are bold, gestural and often foreboding.

Public collections
 Art Gallery of New South Wales
 National Gallery of Victoria, Melbourne, Australia 
 The Kedumba Collection of Australian Drawing
 National Library of Australia

Awards and nominations
Pam Hallandal was awarded the Australian Dobell Drawing Prize for excellence in drawing in 1996 and 2009.

References

Additional sources 

 Cross, Elizabeth (1984), 'Pam Hallandal’, Art Bulletin of Tasmania, page 55.
 Hansen, David (1988), 'The face of Australia : the land & the people, the past & the present’, Fine Arts Press, Sydney, New South Wales.
 Kolenberg, Hendrik (1996), 'Expressive Figuration:Drawings by Kevin Connor, Pam Hallandal and Jan Senbergs’, Exhibition catalogue, 14 December 1996 – 2 February 1997, Art Gallery of New South Wales, Sydney, New South Wales.
 McCulloch, Allan (1984), 'Encyclopedia of Australian Art’, Hutchinson of Australia, Melbourne, Victoria (2nd edn).

External links
https://www.artgallery.nsw.gov.au/collection/works/?q=Pam+Hallandal
https://artgalleryofballarat.com.au/gallery_exhibitions/pam-hallandal-watching/

Australian women artists
1929 births
2018 deaths